Homewood Airport  is located adjacent to Homewood, Manitoba, Canada.

References

Registered aerodromes in Manitoba